Goldenrod, various yellow flowering plants in the family Asteraceae. Usually the genus Solidago, but species in Chrysoma, Euthamia and Oreochrysum are also called goldenrods.

Goldenrod may also refer to:

 Goldenrod (color), a color defined by the W3C for use in Scalable Vector Graphics as RGB (218, 165, 32)
 Goldenrod Records, a record label
 Goldenrod (car), the name of the 1965 land speed record car
 Goldenrod (showboat), a National Historic Landmark in Missouri
 Goldenrod, Florida, a community in the United States
 Goldenrod City, a town in the second generation of the Pokémon franchise.
 "Goldenrod", a song from the band Blondie's album, The Curse of Blondie
 Goldenrod (film), a Canadian western film
 , an American cargo ship in service 1928-35
 Golden Rod Stakes, an annual American horse race